Palmer's chipmunk (Neotamias palmeri) is a species of rodent in the family Sciuridae, endemic to Nevada. Its natural habitat is temperate forests. It is threatened by habitat loss.

Description 
Palmer's chipmunk resembles other chipmunks in that it has solid black and white stripes that run down its body dorsally. The body of the chipmunk is tan while its ventral side is more pale. Adults weigh between 50 and 69.4 grams.

Distribution and habitat 
Palmer's chipmunk is found only in the Spring Mountains of Clark County, southern Nevada. There are some indications that the species prefers to associate with water sources.

Ecology
The caches of Palmer's chipmunk have been found to contain seeds from the ponderosa pine, which are an important food resource of the chipmunk. This species has also been known to eat local fruits, grass, insects, and the seeds of other conifers. The species hibernates during cold weather, but is not an obligate hibernator. On warm winter days, Palmer's chipmunk will come out of its burrow to visit their caches for food.

Reproduction 
Nests are most commonly built on the ground but can occasionally be found in trees. In late spring to early summer, female chipmunks have litters of 3 or 4 pups which are born hairless. After a month or so, the pups have developed a smooth fur coat  and begin to move in and out of the nest. At about 6 weeks old, the pups have moved to a mostly solid food diet.

Conservation
The species has been classified as Endangered by the IUCN. Its habitat is being reduced by the extension of campgrounds, woodcutting, and the increasing sprawl of Las Vegas. Predation by feral dogs and cats is also likely to be a factor.

References

Mammals of the United States
Neotamias
Mammals described in 1897
Taxonomy articles created by Polbot